Cob or COB may refer to:

Animals 
 Cob (horse), a small sturdy horse or large pony
 Cob, an adult male swan
 Cob, a gull or seabird of the genus Larus or of the family Laridae

Parts of plants 
 Corncob, the core or inner part of an ear of maize (corn) on which the kernels grow
 Cob or cob nut, another name for a hazelnut

Materials and objects 
 Cob (material), a building material for making walls using compacted clay, sand and straw
 Cob or cobbing board, a wooden instrument used for punishment: see Paddle (spanking)
 Cob, Spanish gold and silver coins that were irregularly shaped and crudely struck: see Spanish dollar
 Cob, a crusty bread roll shaped like a squashed ball, commonly used in the English Midlands: see List of bread rolls

Geographical objects 
 The Cob, a seawall in Porthmadog, Wales
 The Cob, a seawall in Malltraeth, Anglesey, Wales
 Kingsley Castle, also known as Castle Cob, a medieval motte in Kingsley, Cheshire, England

People 
 Cob Stenham (born 1932), English business executive

Acronyms
 Bolivian Workers' Center, Central Obrera Boliviana in Spanish
 Brazilian Olympic Committee, Comitê Olímpico Brasileiro in Portuguese
 Brazilian Workers Confederation, Confederação Operária Brasileira in Portuguese
 Center of balance (disambiguation), multiple meanings
 Cercle Olympique de Bamako, a Malian football team
 Chairman of the board
 Chief of the boat, the most senior enlisted crewperson on United States Navy submarines
 Children of Bodom, a Finnish metal band
 Chip on board, a method of directly mounting semiconductors on printed circuit boards or substrates
 Church of the Brethren, an American religious denomination of German origin
 Church Office Building, headquarters of the Church of Jesus Christ of Latter-day Saints
 Clerk of the Board, of an organizational board or committee
 Clive's Original Band or C.O.B., an English folk band headed by Clive Palmer
 Close of Business, the formal end of the day in financial markets or offices
 College of The Bahamas, the national public institution of higher education
 Company of Biologists, a UK charity that publishes scientific journals
 Continent-ocean boundary, the boundary between oceanic and continental crust on a passive margin
 Contingency Operating Base, a US military term, a forward operating base
 Continuity of Business, an acronym sometimes used in conjunction with Disaster Recovery
 Corn, Oats and Barley, a grain mix fed to horses and other livestock: see equine nutrition
 Creature Object, a simple programming language for the game Creatures (artificial life program)
 Crew overboard, in boating: see Man overboard

Codes
 cob, the ISO 639-3 code for the Chicomuceltec language of Mexico and Guatemala
 COB, an obsolete country code for Republic of the Congo
 Cooden Beach railway station, a railway station in Sussex, England

See also
 Cobb (disambiguation)
 Kob, an antelope
 COBS (disambiguation)